Mark Soderstrom (born September 15, 1970) is an Adelaide television presenter on SAS Seven and former footballer. He hosted the 2017 Carols by Candlelight, and is a regular sports reporter on Seven News and Australian Rules football reporter on Seven Sport. He is also a breakfast presenter on Mix 102.3 radio as part of Erin Phillips and Soda with Erin Phillips.

Prior to his radio and television career, Soderstrom played 125 SANFL games with Sturt, Glenelg and North Adelaide.

Soderstrom is married to Kate and they have three children. He is also a former physical education and psychology teacher.

References

Australian rules footballers from South Australia
Sturt Football Club players
Glenelg Football Club players
North Adelaide Football Club players
Australian television presenters
Australian radio presenters
Living people
1970 births